Jerry Austin Narron (born January 15, 1956) is an American professional baseball manager, coach, and former player. He most recently served as a major league instructor for the Chicago White Sox. He most recently served as the bench coach for the Boston Red Sox of Major League Baseball (MLB) during the 2020 season. Narron played in MLB, primarily as a catcher, for three teams during 1979–1987. He has served as manager for the Texas Rangers (2001–02) and the Cincinnati Reds (2005–07). 

He was the third base coach for Israel at the 2017 World Baseball Classic. Narron will be a coach for Team Israel, under manager Ian Kinsler, when it competes in the 2023 World Baseball Classic in Miami, Florida, starting March 11–15.

Early years
Narron was born in Goldsboro, North Carolina. He is a Christian Zionist. His father John was employed as a salesman and floor layer for the Isaacs-Kahn Furniture Company in Goldsboro. He is a nephew of former major league catcher and longtime coach Sam Narron.

Through his childhood he played baseball at the Wayne County Boys Club. He attended Goldsboro High School, where he played baseball, basketball, and football, and graduated in 1974. He went to college at East Carolina University.

Playing career
Narron played in the major leagues for eight seasons with the New York Yankees (1979), Seattle Mariners (1980–81, 1987), and California Angels (1983–86).

He was drafted out of high school by the New York Yankees in the sixth round of the 1974 Major League Baseball Draft. He played alongside brother Johnny for the Johnson City Cardinals in the Rookie Appalachian League during his first professional season in 1974, batting .301. In 1977, playing for the West Haven Yankees of the AA Eastern League, he batted .299 (eighth in the league) with 28 home runs (second in the league) and 93 RBIs (third in the league) in 438 at bats.

He made his major league debut on April 13, 1979. Narron played for the Yankees as the backup catcher to Thurman Munson. He was the Yankees' starting catcher the day after Munson's death in a plane crash in August 1979, and remained in the dugout during the pregame ceremonies, leaving the catcher's position empty, out of respect for Munson.

In November 1979 Narron was traded by the Yankees to the Seattle Mariners with Juan Beniquez, Rick Anderson, and Jim Beattie for Jim Lewis and Ruppert Jones.

He was released by the Mariners in March 1982, and signed two days later as a free agent by the California Angels. Playing for the Spokane Indians in the AAA Pacific Coast League (PCL) in 1982, he batted .311 in 408 at bats. In 1983, playing for the Edmonton Trappers of the PCL, he batted .301 with 27 home runs (fourth in the league) and 102 RBIs (sixth in the league) in 539 at bats, while leading the league with 15 intentional walks.  He was released by the Angels in April 1987, and signed later that month by the Seattle Mariners, who in turn released him the following November.  He retired as a player in 1989.

Managing and coaching history

Minor and major leagues
Narron was a manager in the Baltimore Orioles farm system from 1989 through 1992; of the Class A Frederick Keys (1989), AA Hagerstown Suns (1990-91), and AAA Rochester Red Wings (1992), with a record of 291-269 (.520). He was then hired as a coach for the Orioles by skipper Johnny Oates. After two seasons in Baltimore, he moved with Oates to the Texas Rangers.

Narron was third-base coach for the Rangers from 1995 until he was named interim manager on May 4, 2001, after the firing of manager Johnny Oates. He had the interim tag removed and managed the team during the 2002 season. He was replaced in Texas by Buck Showalter in December 2002.

Narron then served as bench coach for the Boston Red Sox during their 2003 run to the American League Championship Series, and performed the same role for Cincinnati in 2004–05.

Narron was named the Reds' interim manager on June 20, 2005. On September 29 of that year, his contract was extended to cover the 2006 season with a mutual option for 2007. Narron was fired as manager of the Reds on July 1, 2007. The Reds named advance scout Pete Mackanin as the interim manager. Narron's record with the Reds was 157–179.

On February 25, 2008, Narron was named a special assignments scout and front-office consultant with the Rangers.

Narron served as bench coach for the Milwaukee Brewers from 2011 to 2015.

Narron was hired to be the 2017 manager of the Reno Aces on December 30, 2016.

After the first seven games of the 2017 season, Narron took over as interim bench coach of the major league Arizona Diamondbacks, when bench coach Ron Gardenhire left the team on a leave of absence to have and recover from prostate cancer surgery. Narron got the job permanently after Gardenhire was hired to be the Detroit Tigers' manager. Narron stepped down from his position as bench coach of the Diamondbacks following the 2019 season.

Narron was hired as bench coach for the Boston Red Sox on February 22, 2020. In October 2020, the team declined to renew his contract.

On February 10, 2021, Narron was hired as a major league instructor for the Chicago White Sox.

Team Israel; World Baseball Classic
Narron was the third base coach for Israel at the 2017 World Baseball Classic qualifier. Narron, whose daughter Callie lives in the Arnona neighborhood of Jerusalem, Israel, with her husband and two children, said: "I love the game, I love the Jewish people and I love Israel".

Narron will be a coach for Team Israel, under manager Ian Kinsler, when it competes in the 2023 World Baseball Classic in Miami, Florida, starting March 11–15.

Managerial records

Personal life
Narron is married to Donna Narron. He has seven children: Connor, Cara, Clare, Caitlyn, Callie, Chelsy and Hunter. His son Connor was the fourth-ranked prospect for the high school class of 2010 by ESPN's Perfect Game. The Orioles selected Connor in the fifth round of the 2010 MLB draft; he played in Minor League Baseball during the 2010 to 2014 seasons. Narron's brother Johnny was the hitting coach for the Milwaukee Brewers from 2012 to 2014. Narron is the nephew of former major league catcher and coach Sam W. Narron and cousin of pitcher Sam F. Narron.

Narron is known for writing out lineup cards using a distinct form of calligraphy, and for rendering the names of players from Japan, Korea and Taiwan in their native scripts on the lineup cards.

References

External links

  
    

1956 births
Living people
American expatriate baseball players in Canada
Arizona Diamondbacks coaches
Baltimore Orioles coaches
Baseball coaches from North Carolina
Baseball players from North Carolina
Boston Red Sox coaches
Calgary Cannons players
California Angels players
Chicago White Sox coaches
Cincinnati Reds coaches
Cincinnati Reds managers
East Carolina Pirates baseball players
Edmonton Trappers players
Fort Lauderdale Yankees players
Johnson City Yankees players
Major League Baseball bench coaches
Major League Baseball catchers
Major League Baseball third base coaches
Milwaukee Brewers coaches
Minor league baseball managers
New York Yankees players
People from Goldsboro, North Carolina
Reno Aces players
Rochester Red Wings managers
Rochester Red Wings players
Seattle Mariners players
Spokane Indians players
Tacoma Yankees players
Texas Rangers managers
West Haven Yankees players